Artemyevo is a rural locality (a village) in Staroselskoye Rural Settlement, Mezhdurechensky District, Vologda Oblast, Russia. The population was 8 as of 2002.

Geography 
Artemyevo is located 27 km southwest of Shuyskoye (the district's administrative centre) by road. Sovka is the nearest rural locality.

References 

Rural localities in Mezhdurechensky District, Vologda Oblast